Marsupilami is a half-hour American animated television series that first appeared on television as a segment of the 1992 show Raw Toonage, and was then spun off into his own eponymous show on CBS for the 1993–94 season. The show was based on the character from the popular comic book by Belgian artist André Franquin et al.

There were three segments in the half-hour show — Marsupilami, Sebastian the Crab and Shnookums and Meat.

Segments

Marsupilami
This segment deals with the adventures of Marsupilami (voiced by Steve Mackall) and his friends Maurice the Gorilla (voiced by Jim Cummings) and Stewart the Elephant (voiced by Dan Castellaneta). Some episodes of Marsupilami would have him either evading Eduardo the Jaguar (voiced by Steve Landesberg) or outwitting a human named Norman (voiced by Jim Cummings).

Many one off characters also appears in the series like the three baby monkeys (Featured in Hey, Hey, They're the Monkeys!, all voiced by Jim Thurman) and their clown owner, Norman's Aunt Bethie (Featured in Romancing the Clone and Safari So Good, voiced by June Foray), Leonardo the Lion (Featured in Jungle Fever, voiced by Jim Cummings) and Cropsy (Featured in Cropsy Turvy), a myth that proved to be real.

Sebastian the Crab
Sebastian the Crab (voiced by Samuel E. Wright) from The Little Mermaid is a segment which takes place in various locations out of the sea after the end of the events of The Little Mermaid. Ariel has become human, married Prince Eric, moved onto land, and almost never has any time to drop by and visit her old friends in the ocean. Flounder and Scuttle have also moved on with their lives now that their best friend Ariel is living away on land. Sebastian has some new adventures, with some of them having him outwit Chef Louie (voiced by René Auberjonois). The events in this segment seem to show that both Sebastian and Louie moved away from the coastal area where The Little Mermaid took place, even though they both returned in the second movie.

Shnookums and Meat
Shnookums and Meat was a secondary segment on this show which would later spin-off into its own show. This segment involves a cat named Shnookums (voiced by Jason Marsden) and a dog named Meat (voiced by Frank Welker) who did not get along very well. Their owners are unseen stock characters only viewed from the neck down and named (appropriately enough) Husband & Wife (voiced by Steve Mackall and Tress MacNeille). Husband is always referring to their home as their "domicile" before the two leave their pets in charge while they are away.

Cast
 René Auberjonois as Chef Louie
 Dan Castellaneta as Stewart the Elephant
 Jim Cummings as Maurice the Gorilla, Norman, Leonardo the Lion
 Steve Landesberg as Eduardo the Jaguar
 Steve Mackall as Marsupilami, Husband
 Tress MacNeille as Wife
 Jason Marsden as Shnookums
 Frank Welker as Meat
 Samuel E. Wright as Sebastian the Crab

Crew
 Bob Hathcock - Director
 Ed Wexler - Director
 Ginny McSwain – Dialogue Director

Production
There were 13 episodes in the series, which lasted one season and ended on December 11, 1993. Reruns of the show were aired on The Disney Channel (from October 1994 to June 1995), and later on Toon Disney. Each of the 13 episodes would feature one new "Marsupilami" short, then one short either featuring Sebastian the Crab or Shnookums and Meat, and then an old "Marsupilami" short, from "Raw Toonage". Three of the 16 "Marsupilami" shorts made for "Raw Toonage" – "Wanna Be Ruler", "The Young and the Nestless", and "Hot Spots" – were not included in the 1993 "Marsupilami" series, but do appear on the PAL video releases.

The original Marsupilami comic stories by Franquin never had a speaking Marsupilami and never featured a gorilla or elephant in the Marsupilami's wild habitat, since these species are native to Africa, while the Marsupilami species in the comic version was said to come from South America. Another change is that Disney's animated Marsupilami can speak, whereas his comic counterpart can only mimic sound like a parrot.

Episodes

Home media

North American (NTSC) releases
Three VHS and Betamax compilations, each containing five Marsupilami shorts, were released in North America by Walt Disney Home Video.

European and Oceania (PAL) releases
Five VHS cassettes, and Betamax cassettes collecting the entire production of Marsupilami shorts produced by Disney, were released in Europe and Oceania by Walt Disney Home Video.

References

External links

 
 

1990s American animated television series
1993 American television series debuts
1993 American television series endings
American children's animated comedy television series
American animated television spin-offs
CBS original programming
Disney Channel original programming
English-language television shows
Television series based on Belgian comics
Television series by Disney Television Animation
Comedy franchises
Marsupilami
Internet memes